= Interposon =

Segments of DNA that induce mutations in bacteria

Interposons are segments of DNA that induce mutations in bacteria. They are made up of a short strand of genes and alter a few mRNA transcripts. Insertions or deletions can occur to the genes leading to a change in genotype and potentially phenotype of the prokaryote. Interposons change DNA through a process called conjugation which is a form of horizontal gene transfer. This occurs after binary fission exclusively in gram negative bacteria where, through direct contact, plasmids are exchanged and DNA is altered.

== History ==
The earliest use of interposons was in a laboratory in 1984 by researchers Joachim Frey and Henry M. Krisch. A 2 kilobase DNA segment called the Ω interposon was introduced to the pWW0 TOL plasmid of Pseudomonas putida. This bacteria is gram-negative, lives in moderate temperatures, and consumes detritus or organic matter that isn't from an organism. P. putida is typically found in soil or roots and is resistant to harsh environments. The Ω interposon was added by a method called insertional mutagenesis which will be further described below. The researchers then found that insertional mutagenesis allows for positive selection of mutants, termination of RNA, the production of proteins further than insertion site, and an overall more stable mutation. They found that they were able to apply this to many gram-negative bacteria and its uses will be described in the "associated uses" section.

Insertional mutagenesis, in general, and interposons, in particular, are foundational technologies for genetic research experiments. Insertional mutagenesis works by using introducing new genes by use of transposons and interposons. These work more specifically and they are able to more easily find genes compared to other mutation techniques like radiation or N-ethyl-N-nitrosourea (ENU) which have been previously, more commonly used. This technique has been a basis to the field of cancer research. Scientists have used mutagenesis to identify what genes cause mutations, and as a result, cancer. Because of the specificity of interposons, certain genes, and their impacts on cells, can be recognized. By knowing the specific genes that cause cancer, prevention and treatment are more easily researchable and applicable.

== Applications ==
Interposons can have a plethora of applications. For example, they may be used for the purpose of studying drug resistance. This occurs by inserting the interposon in a specific gene. The interposon carriers markers. The expression of these markers in said gene allow scientists to gather information on mutant genes within the sequence.

The addition of an Interposon within a gene can also eliminate the expression of said genes. This occurs when the addition fits between a promotor and the gene itself.

Interposons can have a role in the resistance of antibiotics. Interposons have the ability to block and repress the effects of antibiotics in certain bacteria. Including: Utilizing Interposons as a tool in genetic engineering and therapy, particularly in the treatment of T-cells addressing autoimmune disorders, for example, leukemia and lymphoma. Interposons are a viable alternative to traditional plasmid-based gene edits, which have low delivery and integration rates and the potential to cause errors in the expression of specific T-cell genes. Interposons have also affected bioindustrial applications, genetic engineering, providing alternative methods of transgenesis, increasing our ability to manipulate Gene lines of vertebrates, and allowing the creation of more specific, high-throughput Gene screens that give greater control over desired mutations in cells. The mapping of the human genome sequence was a decade-long project that linked individual genes and their expression to their functions and associated codons. Despite the significant investment required, the project greatly expanded scientific understanding of human biology. In comparison, Interposon insertional mutagenesis enables gene mapping on an industrial scale while requiring substantially fewer man-hours and resources. As an extension of the aforementioned ability to easily identify mutated alleles and deliberately induce mutation, interposons have made it far easier to identify how genes relate to disease and subsequent treatment. One of the large-scale practical uses of interposons in sequencing is in Agricultural Science, specifically as an alternative to artificial pesticides, with a switch to genetically modified organisms. Due to the nebulous nature of how bacterial and plant genetics interact, interposons are being used to rapidly decode the relationship and enable more accurate and efficient use of genetic engineering.

Interposons are a piece of DNA whose function is to disrupt the function of a gene. They work by utilizing restriction enzymes to cut the gene, interposons are then inserted within the cut DNA. With the newly inserted interposons, the gene being expressed is then put to a halt. This occurs through translation and transcriptions signals being halted when interposons are added. The addition of the termination signals causes RNA polymerase to stop transcribing the gene. This then allows the bacteria with the newly inserted gene to survive in certain conditions, such as an added antibiotic resistance.

Interposons are important tools in bacterial genetics because they let scientists alter DNA and study the changes in the way cells behave. Interposons can insert and disrupt genes, which can show the effect that a sequence can have on traits like metabolism, drug resistance, and cell function in general. When looking at interposons, they show that genetic material could be moved between different bacteria artificially. This opens new pathways for research in both medicine and microbiology.

Interposons are used in studies ranging from understanding antibiotic resistance, to the genetic mechanisms of disease. Newer techniques continue to build on interposon technology to connect genotype to phenotype for the bacterial genome.
